Rilski may refer to:

BC Rilski Sportist, Bulgarian basketball club
PFC Rilski Sportist Samokov, Bulgarian football club
Ivan Rilski (876- c. 946), Bulgarian hermit and saint
Spiridon Rilski (1740-1824), Bulgarian monk and educator
Neofit Rilski (1793-1881), the Neophyte of Rila, Bulgarian monk and teacher
Rilski Manastir, also Rila Monastery, the monastery of Saint John of Rila, in Bulgaria
St. Ivan Rilski Chapel, in the South Shetland Islands
St. Ivan Rilski Col, geographic feature
South-West University "Neofit Rilski", Bulgarian university

See also
Rylsky (disambiguation)